Albert Makiadi (born 11 July 1997) is a French professional footballer who plays as a midfielder for Norwegian club Kvik Halden FK.

Professional career
Makiadi signed AC Ajaccio on 17 July 2017, after developing in the FC Girondins de Bordeaux academy. Makiadi made his debut for AC Ajaccio in a 2–1 Ligue 2 loss to LB Châteauroux on 3 November 2017.

After a trial at Norwegian club Kvik Halden FK, Makiadi signed a one-year contract with the club on 1 February 2019.

International career
Born in France, Makiadi is of Congolese descent. Makiadi is a youth international for France.

References

External links
 
 
 
 
 

1997 births
Living people
Association football midfielders
Association football defenders
French footballers
France youth international footballers
French sportspeople of Democratic Republic of the Congo descent
AC Ajaccio players
Kvik Halden FK players
Ligue 2 players
Championnat National 3 players
Norwegian Second Division players
Black French sportspeople